Ian F. Pollack is an American pediatric neurosurgeon currently the A. Leland Albright Distinguished Professor and Walter E. Dandy Professor at University of Pittsburgh and has been featured in Who’s Who in America and Who’s Who in the World.

References

Year of birth missing (living people)
Living people
University of Pittsburgh faculty
American pediatricians
American neurosurgeons
Emory University alumni
Johns Hopkins University alumni